Glenwood Park is a  public park in Portland, Oregon's Lents neighborhood, in the United States. The park was acquired in 1941.

References

External links

 

1941 establishments in Oregon
Lents, Portland, Oregon
Parks in Portland, Oregon